Limla is a census town in Surat district in the Indian state of Gujarat.

Demographics
 India census, Limla had a population of 6622. Males constitute 56% of the population and females 44%. Limla has an average literacy rate of 75%, higher than the national average of 59.5%: male literacy is 79%, and female literacy is 70%. In Limla, 11% of the population is under 6 years of age.

References

See also 
List of tourist attractions in Surat

Suburban area of Surat
Cities and towns in Surat district